Hendrik Willem "Henk" Hermsen (29 August 1937 – 2022) was a water polo player from the Netherlands, who competed in two Summer Olympics for his native country. In 1960 he finished in eighth position with the Dutch Men's Team. Four years later in Tokyo, he once again came in eighth with the Holland squad. He was born in Hilversum. Two of his brothers, André and Wim, also played water polo for the national team.

See also
 Netherlands men's Olympic water polo team records and statistics
 List of men's Olympic water polo tournament goalkeepers

References

External links
 
 Dutch Olympic Committee

1937 births
2022 deaths
Sportspeople from Hilversum
Dutch male water polo players
Water polo goalkeepers
Olympic water polo players of the Netherlands
Water polo players at the 1960 Summer Olympics
Water polo players at the 1964 Summer Olympics
20th-century Dutch people